Jessica Phillips (born November 3, 1971) is an American actress, best known for her roles in multiple Broadway shows and the role of Pippa Cox in Law & Order: Special Victims Unit.

Early life and education
Phillips is the eldest daughter of Dr. Gary Phillips, a religious historian and writer, and Alice Phillips. She was born in Nashville, Tennessee, but raised in Sutton, Massachusetts. Phillips was a competitive dancer before turning to acting, studying the Linklater Technique as a teen and later training under Kristin Linklater herself. Phillips attended the Worcester Academy in Worcester, Massachusetts, where she graduated in 1989.  She then earned a BFA in musical theatre in 1994 from Emerson College, where she studied under director Leo Nickole.

Career
Her first audition after college led to the role of Mrs. Walker in the Broadway touring company of The Who's Tommy.

In 1999, she returned to Nashville for five years, where she appeared in the Joseph and the Amazing Technicolor Dreamcoat musical and performed on radio as a demo singer.

Phillips has starred in multiple Broadway shows, including all three versions of The Scarlet Pimpernel (Marguerite), Next to Normal (Diana), Priscilla, Queen of the Desert (Marion), and most recently Leap of Faith (Marla).

Phillips performed at the grand re-opening of Radio City Music Hall, hosted by Billy Crystal and has shared the stage with Billy Porter, Estelle Parsons, Marc Kudisch, Leslie Odom Jr., and Alice Ripley. She also starred as Ellen in the world premiere of Unknown Soldier at the Williamstown Theater Festival in 2015.  and as Michele Serling in Deathless by Zack Zadek at Goodspeed Musicals in 2017.

Television
She has guest starred in several television series including Unforgettable, Royal Pains, and Elementary. Between 2013 and 2016, Phillips played attorney Pippa Cox in seven episodes of Law & Order: Special Victims Unit on NBC. NBC nominated her for the Outstanding Guest Actress in a Drama Series for the 2016 Emmy Awards, but she did not progress to the final round.

Country music
With Tad Wilson, a former cast member (and her future husband), Phillips sang in the country duo, "10th & Carlisle."

Personal life
Phillips has two sons, Jonah and Malcolm, from a prior marriage to Nicholas Rohlfing. She married Tad Wilson on July 15, 2017, and the two split up in 2021. Phillips came out publicly as queer in February 2022.

Theatre credits 

•

Filmography

Film

Television

References

External links
 
 

1971 births
Actresses from Nashville, Tennessee
Actresses from Worcester, Massachusetts
Actresses from New York City
Living people
American stage actresses
21st-century American actresses
American queer actresses